MS Prinsendam, a Holland-America Line cruise ship built at Shipyard de Merwede in the Netherlands in 1973, was 427 feet long and typically carried about 350 passengers and 200 crew members. The ship was sailing through the Gulf of Alaska, approximately 120 miles south of Yakutat, Alaska, at midnight on October 4, 1980, when a fire broke out in the engine room. The vessel's master, Cornelis Dirk Wabeke (April 13, 1928 – August 16, 2011), declared the fire out of control one hour later and the Prinsendam sent a radio call requesting immediate assistance. The United States Coast Guard at Communications Station Kodiak, Alaska requested that the Prinsendam send out an SOS, but the captain declined. Chief Radio Officer Jack van der Zee sent one out anyway about a half-hour later, which alerted nearby vessels.

United States Coast Guard, USAF Air Rescue Service, and Royal Canadian Air Force CH-113 helicopters which had greater range, rescued the passengers and crew. Two USAF pararescuemen were inserted into one of the lifeboats. This boat was the last rescued with a flare spotted by lookout SN Louis Roderick aboard the USCGC Woodrush which was then relayed to the on-scene commander, USCGC Boutwell. The Sohio Intrepid and the Williamsburgh assisted on scene. The Williamsburgh served a vital role as a communications platform and was the first vessel to arrive on scene and take passengers on board. The Sohio Intrepid served as a platform for one of the USAF helicopters that was unable to refuel in flight. The rescue took place during a period of steadily deteriorating weather. The passenger vessel capsized and sank on October 8. The rescue is particularly noteworthy because of the distance traveled by the rescuers, the coordination of independent organizations, and the fact that all 520 passengers and crew were rescued without loss of life or serious injury.

References

External links
David J. Ring, Jr., N1EA, Radio Officer, "T/T WILLIAMSBURGH", "SOS from ms PRINSENDAM - Marine Radio History - Morse Code", August 17, 2018.

1980 in Alaska
1972 ships
Maritime incidents in 1980
Ship fires
Ships built in the Netherlands
Ships of the Holland America Line
Shipwrecks of the Alaska coast
Ships sunk with no fatalities